Maria Georgieuna Zakharevich (born November 28, 1936, in Minsk region, Belarus) is a Belarusian theater actress, director, and People’s Artists of Belorussian SSR awarded with Order of Friendship of Peoples (1986), Order of Francysk Skaryna (2020), Veteran of Labour medal (1987), and Francysk Skaryna medal (1996).

Biography 

Zakharevich graduated from Belarusian State Academy of Arts in 1957 and was hired by Yanka Kupala National Academic Theater. For nearly 50 years of service, Zakharevich played more than 60 roles. She performed roles in any genre be it drama, comedy, or tragedy.

She was featured in the movies:
 “Somebody else’s fatherland",  
 "I, Francysk Skaryna...",  
 "People in the swamp",  
 "Ruins shoot...", etc.

In 2016, in commemoration of Zakharevich’s 80th anniversary, Myadzel Museum of People’s Glory dedicated a special photo exhibition to her.

Awards 
 Recipient of the State Prize of Byelorussian SSR (1984).
 Certificate of Merit of the Council of Minister of the Republic of Belarus.
 Orders of the Friendship of Peoples (1986) and Francysk Skaryna (2020).
 Medals Veteran of Labour (1987) and Francysk Skaryna (1996).
 People’s Artist of Byelorussian SSR (1977).
 Honorary Citizen of the Minsk Oblast (2012).
 Honorary Citizen of Myadel Region (2014).

References

Bibliography 

 Ліпскі У. Нарачанская Чайка: п’еса-ява пра Марыю Захарэвіч, народную артыстку Беларусі / Уладзімір Ліпскі. — Мінск : Беларусь, 2006. — 125 с.: іл. — .
 Захаревич Мария Георгиевна на сайте Национальной киностудии «Беларусьфільм»
 Захаревич Мария Георгиевна на сайте Белорусские актёры театра и кино
 Захаревич Мария Георгиевна на официальном сайте Минского областного исполнительного комитета
 Захаревич Мария Георгиевна на сайте Мядельского районного исполнительного комитета
 Личное дело. Мария Захаревич: В рот режиссёрам никогда не смотрела
 Творческая встреча с одной из величайших актрис — Марией Георгиевной Захаревич
 Мария Захаревич: ОБЫКНОВЕННОЕ ЧУДО
 У гасцях — Марыя Захарэвіч (бел.)

Belarusian film actresses
Belarusian State Academy of Arts alumni
People's Artists of Belarus
Recipients of the Byelorussian SSR State Prize
Recipients of the Order of Friendship of Peoples
Recipients of the Order of Francysk Skaryna
21st-century Belarusian actresses
20th-century Belarusian actresses
Soviet actresses
Living people
1936 births